This was the first edition of the tournament.

Carlos Taberner won the title by walkover after Marco Cecchinato withdrew before the final.

Seeds

Draw

Finals

Top half

Bottom half

References

External links
Main draw
Qualifying draw

Lošinj Open - 1